Bauerle is a surname. Notable people with the surname include:

Amelia Bauerle (1873–1916), British painter, illustrator, and etcher
Cynthia Bauerle, American molecular biologist and college administrator
Jack Bauerle (born  1952), American swimming coach